Electrogaz FC is a football club in the Rwanda National Football League. The team was founded in 2008. It is named after Rwanda's electricity and water utility company Electrogaz. In 2010 they were expelled from the Premier League because the players were not being paid.

References

Football clubs in Rwanda
Association football clubs established in 2008
2008 establishments in Rwanda